One in a Million is the second studio album by American singer Aaliyah. It was released on August 13, 1996, by Blackground Records and Atlantic Records. Recorded from August 1995 to July 1996, the album features collaborations with a variety of producers and writers, including Timbaland, Missy Elliott, Carl-So-Lowe, J. Dibbs, Jermaine Dupri, Kay Gee, Vincent Herbert, Rodney Jerkins, Craig King, Darren Lighty and Darryl Simmons, as well as several guest appearances, including those from Elliott, Timbaland, Treach and Slick Rick.

One in a Million garnered generally positive reviews from music critics. It debuted at number 20 on the US Billboard 200 chart, selling 40,500 copies during its first week and later peaked at number 18; following its 2021 reissue, it reached a new peak at number 10.  Within several months, the album was certified double platinum by the Recording Industry Association of America (RIAA). It has sold over three million copies in the United States and eight million worldwide.

One in a Million produced six singles—"If Your Girl Only Knew", "Got to Give It Up", "One in a Million", "4 Page Letter", "The One I Gave My Heart To" and "Hot Like Fire"—with "The One I Gave My Heart To" becoming the album's highest-charting single, peaking at number nine on the US Billboard Hot 100. Retrospectively, the album has been listed among the best albums of its era by numerous critics and has been credited for elevating careers of Timbaland and Elliott.

Background and development
After Aaliyah's uncle Barry Hankerson obtained a distribution deal with Jive Records, he signed her to his label Blackground Records when she was 12 years old. He introduced her to R. Kelly, who became her mentor, as well as the lead songwriter and producer for her debut studio album Age Ain't Nothing but a Number (1994). A commercial success, the album was certified double platinum by the Recording Industry Association of America (RIAA), selling three million copies in the United States and six million worldwide. To promote the album, Aaliyah embarked on a 1994–1995 world tour throughout the US, Europe, Japan and South Africa.
After facing allegations of an illegal marriage with Kelly, Aaliyah ended her contract with Jive and signed with Atlantic Records. According to Aaliyah's cousin and Blackground Records executive Jomo Hankerson, the music industry "villainized" Aaliyah for her scandal with Kelly and it was hard to get producers for One in a Million. In an interview, he said: "We were coming off of a multi-platinum debut album and except for a couple of relationships with Jermaine Dupri and Puffy, it was hard for us to get producers on the album." Aaliyah commented on the situation by saying: "I faced the adversity, I could've broken down, I could've gone and hid in the closet and said, 'I'm not going to do this anymore.' But I love singing, and I wasn't going to let that mess stop me. I got a lot of support from my fans and that inspired me to put that behind me, be a stronger person, and put my all into making One in a Million."

In a press release accompanying One in a Million, Aaliyah admitted to being "a little anxious about jumping from Jive to Atlantic and changing up her sound, but that uncertainty never filters into the music." However, with a new distributing deal with Atlantic and a new team of producers, One in a Million was going to re-establish Aaliyah's fanbase and broaden her mainstream appeal, as the album featured a wide range of producers, unlike Age Ain't Nothing but a Number, which was produced solely by Kelly. Additionally, with the release of One in a Million, Aaliyah adapted a sexier image, which was quickly noticed by the public. In a 1997 article discussing the music video for "One in a Million", MTV staff felt that Aaliyah was getting "all grown up and steamy in the video", to which Aaliyah responded by saying "as far as it being sexy, I would prefer to say sensual. Sensual is being in tune with your sensual self. Sexy, I mean that's in the eye of the beholder, such as beauty is in the eye of the beholder. So if people term it sexy, it's different. So I just think it's being sensual, I would rather term it as that."

Recording and production

One in a Million was recorded from August 1995 until July 1996, with Craig Kallman, Barry Hankerson and Jomo Hankerson serving as executive producers. Other producers involved in crafting the album include Rodney Jerkins, Jermaine Dupri, Daryl Simmons, Vincent Herbert, Craig King, Carl-So-Low, KayGee from Naughty by Nature, Missy Elliott and Timbaland. While speaking with Billboard about the development of the album, Atlantic Records' product-development director Eddie Santiago mentioned: "We wanted Aaliyah to keep growing, so we didn't want to have the same suspects on her new project". In the same interview, Aaliyah discussed the direction of the album: "I wanted to maintain my smooth street musical image but wanted to be funky and hot yet sophisticated". With One in a Million, Aaliyah was more involved with crafting the album's material by taking co-writing credits and assisting in the creative direction of the project. She co-wrote and was involved with the vocal arrangement of the song "No Days Go By", which was produced by Herbert and King along with Rheji Burrell. Initially, Sean Combs was to helm the production of One in a Million but the songs in which he collaborated with Aaliyah were never finished. According to Aaliyah, "I went to [Combs'] studio in Trinidad for a week, we started working together but we couldn't finish the songs on time. I had to leave, because I had to go to Atlanta to record with Jermaine Dupri."

After plans to have Combs produce the album fell through, Herbert and King were asked to work on the album. King stated: "We came in right as she got her budget ready to go. Vincent and I were the first people she called, we were the first group. That's why we had so much freedom to go in and create a sound because we didn't have to do a song here or there. They wanted us to go in and build a sound. We built a sound and it was a departure from R. Kelly." Aaliyah recorded about eight songs with King at the Vanguard Studios. King stated: "We did about eight songs and out of the eight, four made it", including a cover of "Got to Give It Up" by Marvin Gaye and "Never Givin' Up". When discussing her reasoning for covering "Got to Give It Up" Aaliyah stated, "I wanted some real party songs, so when my uncle played me that [original track], I thought of how I could make it different. Slick Rick [who had been in jail] was on work release at the time, so Vincent got him on the song". Overall, she was hopeful about the song adding: "I don't know how Marvin Gaye fans will react, but I hope they like it, I always think it's a great compliment when people remake songs. I hope one day after I'm not here that people will cover my songs".

"Never Givin' Up" was written by King and Monica Payne, and according to King, "We started to work on the track, writing lyrics. She sat on the floor and the first line, 'Sitting here in this empty room,' because the room was fairly empty because I had just moved into that house". The song was King's way of showing love to The Isley Brothers; it was also an ode to the gospel group The Clark Sisters. Originally, the song was meant to be a solo song but after Aaliyah heard an earlier demo with singer Tavarius Polk, she loved his voice and the producers decided to keep him on the song, which turned it into a duet. The song was recorded in one session, with Aaliyah recording the song with the lights turned completely off in the recording booth, so people could not see her face. After recording songs with King and Herbert, Aaliyah then went to Atlanta to meet with Carl-So-Lowe and Dupri, with whom she ended up collaborating with for three to four days. In an interview, Lowe mentioned: "I believe Jomo, Barry Hankerson's son, reached out to So So Def and I think it happened from there. I knew she was coming to Atlanta, and we had nothing prepared at the time". Meanwhile, Aaliyah wanted to record songs with the duo that were "simplified" and "really good".

The song "The One I Gave My Heart To" came into fruition when Diane Warren expressed interest in working with Aaliyah; Warren said: "I remember really liking Aaliyah and wanting to work with her." Warren reached out to Kallman to express her wish to work with Aaliyah and Kallman agreed to the collaboration. Warren's goal in working with Aaliyah was to have her perform a certain song that she would not have normally performed to showcase a different side of her, which included displaying her vocal range in a different way than what she was used to doing. Once Warren was on board, producer Babyface was chosen to produce the song. Due to unforeseen circumstances, he was unable to complete the work, so he enlisted producer Daryl Simmons to replace him instead.
Simmons would go on to produce the album version of the song, while producer Guy Roche would go on to produce the single version.

When Aaliyah signed with Atlantic, she and Kallman discussed that it was important to find innovative producers who were not widely known to produce the album, as the ultimate goal was to find Aaliyah her own new sound which would define her as an artist. Eventually, Kallman started meeting with multiple unknown songwriters and producers, stating: "I really just started meeting with tons and tons of new songwriters and producers, just looking for someone creative that had their own spin on things. And one day, this young kid came in. His name was Tim Mosley. He started playing me beats and it was a really obvious meeting of, 'This doesn't sound like anything that's out there and really had its own super exciting and electric, just dynamic properties." According to Kallman, "I called up Aaliyah, and I said, 'You need to meet this guy. His name's Timbaland, and he's new. He's out of the Devonte [Swing] camp.' I said 'I think this could be your muse to really create something special.' And they hit it off".

Prior to meeting Timbaland and Elliott Aaliyah's label received a demo from them, of a song called "Sugar and Spice". The label felt that the song was too childish content-wise but they liked both its structure and melody so they sent it to Aaliyah. After hearing the song, she thought that record was the best thing that she had ever heard. Consequently, Timbaland and Elliott were flown to Detroit to work with her. Aaliyah stated: "At first, Tim and Missy were skeptical if I would like their work, but I thought it was tight, just ridiculous. Their sound was different and unique, and that's what appealed to me", adding: "Before we got together, I talked to them on the phone and told them what I wanted. I said, 'You guys know I have a street image, but there is a sexiness to it, and I want my songs to complement that'; I told them that before I even met them. Once I said that, I didn't have to say anything else. Everything they brought me was the bomb." Subsequently, Aaliyah began recording with Timbaland and Elliott at the Vanguard Studios in Detroit; the first songs she recorded for the album with the duo were "One in a Million" and "If Your Girl Only Knew". After spending a week recording songs at the Vanguard Studios, the trio flew to Ithaca, New York, to work on more songs at the Pyramid Studios.

Music and lyrics
According to Micha Frazer-Carroll from The Independent, One in a Million "had a bold, expansive vision, with tracks effortlessly bouncing from trip-hop to sensual slow jams to jungle beats". The album opens with an "alarm call" from the jungle-inspired intro "Beats 4 Da Streets", featuring commentary from Missy Elliott. Throughout the intro, Elliott repeatedly calls Aaliyah's name and tells her to wake up, while various sounds such as echoing amid bells, blippy synths, and heavy bass are playing in the background.
The second track "Hot Like Fire" is a "fine" trip hop song and it is described as a "panting minimalist controlled-blaze baby-maker" with suggestive lyrics. On "Hot Like Fire", Aaliyah "hums and moans promises to her new bae that his patience will be rewarded". The album's title track is an ethereal club ballad with "seductive" trip hop, funk, electronica, and drum and bass influences; it features "shimmering" synths and crickets within its production. On "One in a Million", Aaliyah "communicates love and commitment to her man."

The fourth track "A Girl Like You" is a hip hop-inspired track with a "standard 90s boom-bap beat", where Aaliyah "holds her own" against featured rapper Treach from Naughty by Nature. During the chorus, both Aaliyah and Treach engage in a "cute back-and-forth". The fifth track "If Your Girl Only Knew" is a "bouncing" funk, pop and hip hop song described by critics as "teasingly witchy". On "If Your Girl Only Knew", Aaliyah "chides a man for hitting on her when he already has a girlfriend". The song features heavy keyboard and organ work along with live drums and a thumping bassline. The sixth and seventh tracks "Choosey Lover (Old School/New School)" and "Got to Give It Up" are both covers, of songs originally performed by The Isley Brothers and Marvin Gaye, respectively, with the latter featuring a guest appearance from rapper Slick Rick. "Choosey Lover (Old School/New School)", "mimics the 1983 original faithfully for the first four minutes before departing into a more modern extended outro". While, on "Got to Give It Up", Aaliyah places her falsetto "toe to toe against the liquid overlapping rhyme scheme of hip hop's ultimate storyteller Slick Rick". On the eighth track "4 Page Letter", Aaliyah tells her "crush to keep an eye out for the mailman" because she has sent him a love letter, while recalling and following her parents' advice.

The ninth track "Everything's Gonna Be Alright" has been described as a "carefree anthem for the summertime block party", while the tenth track "Giving You More" was described as being a suggestive song with Aaliyah playing a "reassuring lover". The eleventh track "I Gotcha' Back" has been described as a "jeep-friendly" mid-tempo G-funk song and contains an interpolation from the song "Lean on Me" performed by Bill Withers. On "I Gotcha' Back", Aaliyah is promising devotion to her potential boyfriend: "When no one else is there, with me you can chill". The twelfth track "Never Givin' Up" is a duet with singer Tavarius Polk, as Aaliyah "plays reassuring lover" on the song. While the jungle-inspired thirteenth track "Heartbroken" has been described as being a "beautifully composed ballad" in which, "drums fill out the space surrounding the low, shifting two-tone synth hum that serves as the song's backbone". On "Heartbroken", Aaliyah is "tired of being the more loving one in a lousy relationship and she's tired of having her heart broken".

The fourteenth track "Never Comin' Back" features "Timbaland aping the sound of a live band vamping on a laid back groove, while Aaliyah does a call-and-response harmony routine with an imaginary concert audience over canned crowd noise". On the song, Aaliyah is "Feeling used in a relationship, she stands up for herself and dumps the bum". The fifteenth track "Ladies in da House" features guest appearances from both Missy Elliott and Timbaland. The sixteenth track "The One I Gave My Heart To" is a Pop and R&B power ballad, where Aaliyah is "highlighting a broken heart and sense of betrayal". In a review by Billboard, the production of the song was described as having a "careful balance of straight ahead pop and R&B sensibilities in producer Guy Roche's instrumental arrangement". The final track on the album is the outro "Came to Give Love", featuring Timbaland.

Artwork
The cover artwork and overall packaging for One in a Million were photographed by Marc Baptiste, who had previously photographed Aaliyah's cover shoot for Seventeen. After the Seventeen cover shoot, Baptiste and Aaliyah crossed paths again through mutual friend Kidada Jones. Baptiste stated: "I ran into my friend Kidada Jones who is Quincy Jones' daughter. They were really good friends back then. She introduced us at The Mercer Hotel. We got along great and the next thing I know, 'I'm going to put my album out. Let's meet.'" A month later, the two met to discuss possible concepts for the artwork and after hearing his ideas, Aaliyah decided that she wanted to work with him.

The photo shoot for One in a Million lasted from 9 a.m. until 11 p.m. at various locations in New York City, with the album cover itself being photographed at the Canal Street station late into the session, between 10:30 p.m. and 11 p.m. On the concept for the artwork, Baptiste said: "I wanted to keep her real. The fact that she grew up in Detroit and was born in Brooklyn, I wanted to give the album cover a street-chic vibe so that she's more approachable to an audience. I didn't want to bring her in a Bentley or anything like that. That wasn't her. She was a down to Earth person. I wanted to keep it street chic and play off her beauty".

Release and promotion
In an effort to generate visual awareness for One in a Million, Aaliyah's record label Blackground Records ran advertisements from June 24 to July 8, 1996, on cable channels such as BET and The Box. The music video for the album's lead single "If Your Girl Only Knew" was serviced to both local and national video shows on July 8. Immediately after "If Your Girl Only Knew" and its accompanying video were released, the label went on a heavy print-ad campaign featuring Aaliyah in Seventeen, The Source and other media publications. Due to Aaliyah's outstanding academic performance in school, Blackground planned to run advertisements in React, an educational teen publication inserted in various daily and weekly papers across the United States. Since Aaliyah was an advocate for breast-cancer screenings and crusades against Alzheimer's disease, Blackground also planned for her to do a series of public service announcements on those subjects. One in a Million was first released in European countries starting August 13, and was released in the US two weeks later. An international promotional tour was planned in support of the album, in which she would tour from late summer until the early fall of 1996 in the US and towards the end of September in the United Kingdom, Germany, South Africa and Japan.

In September, Aaliyah made an appearance at MTV's sixth annual Rock N' Jock event, which aired on October 26. During the event, she participated in a celebrity basketball game and performed her song "If Your Girl Only Knew" during the halftime show. On October 11, 1996, Aaliyah performed on Soul Train ; at the end of the month on October 24, she made an appearance on the British show The O-Zone. Aaliyah made an appearance on the Fox television series New York Undercovers January 16, 1997, episode as a musical guest, performing "Choosey Lover (Old School/New School)". On February 14, Aaliyah performed "One in a Million" on Live with Regis and Kathie Lee ; Four days later on February 18, she performed the song on The Tonight Show with Jay Leno. On February 21, 1997, Aaliyah Performed "If Your girl Only Knew" and "One in a Million", on Showtime at the Apollo. In March, Aaliyah made an appearance at the annual MTV Spring Break event in Panama City, Florida. During the event, Aaliyah performed "One in a Million" and hosted a segment from The Grind, where she interviewed the Spice Girls before their performance. Aaliyah was also planning a 1997 tour with Az Yet and Foxy Brown, but the plans never materialized.

On July 25, 1997, it was announced that Aaliyah was performing at KUBE 93 FM's Summer Jam '97 concert at The Gorge Amphitheatre in Grant County, Washington. In August, MTV News reported that she was going on a nationwide tour with Dru Hill, Ginuwine, Bone Thugs-n-Harmony and Mary J. Blige. The tour started on August 28 in Buffalo, New York, and ended on October 5 in Phoenix, Arizona. In August, Aaliyah made a televised appearance on the short-lived talk show Vibe, where she performed "Hot Like Fire" and gave the show's host a gift basket filled with promotional items. She also performed at KKBT's annual Summer Jam concert at the Irvine Meadows Amphitheatre in Irvine, California, the same month. In September, Aaliyah performed "One in a Million" on the Nickelodeon sketch comedy show All That. On October 6, 1997, Aaliyah performed "The One I Gave My Heart To", on The Keenen Ivory Wayans Show. Thirteen days later, she performed "The One I Gave My Heart To" at Nickelodeon's fourth annual The Big Help event in Santa Monica, California. On November 26, 1997, she performed "The One I Gave My Heart To" on the BET show Planet Groove. On December 10, Aaliyah performed "The One I Gave My Heart To" at the UNICEF Gift of Song benefit gala, which aired live on TNT. Also in December, she performed on the annual Christmas in Washington television special. Aaliyah also co-headlined the B-96 B-Bash, hosted by the Chicago radio station B96.

In August 2021, it was reported that the album and Aaliyah's other recorded work for Blackground (since rebranded as Blackground Records 2.0) would be re-released on physical, digital, and streaming services in a deal between the label and Empire Distribution. One in a Million was reissued on August 20, 2021, despite Aaliyah's estate issuing a statement in response to Blackground 2.0's announcement, denouncing the "unscrupulous endeavor to release Aaliyah's music without any transparency or full accounting to the estate".

Singles

"If Your Girl Only Knew" was released as the lead single from One in a Million on July 15, 1996. It peaked at number 11 on the US Billboard Hot 100, and has sold over 600,000 copies in the United States. The song peaked atop the Hot R&B/Hip-Hop Songs, staying at the summit for two consecutive weeks. It was a moderate success in the United Kingdom, peaking at number 21 on the UK Singles Chart when it was originally released as a standalone single. In 1997, it was re-released with "One in a Million" as a double A-side single and reached a new peak position of number 15. The song also peaked within the top ten on both the UK Dance Chart and the UK R&B Chart at numbers six and four, respectively. 

In New Zealand, "If Your Girl Only Knew" peaked at number 20.

"Got to Give It Up" was released as the second single in select international markets on November 4, 1996. It peaked at numbers 37 and 34 in New Zealand and the UK, respectively. "Got to Give It Up" peaked at numbers ten and four on the UK Dance Chart and the UK R&B Chart, respectively.

"One in a Million" was released as the second single in the United States and third overall on November 26. In the US, the song was ineligible to enter the Billboard Hot 100 and Hot R&B/Hip-Hop Songs due to its airplay-only release, as Billboards rules at the time allowed only commercially-available singles to chart. Consequently, it peaked at number 25 on the Radio Songs chart and atop R&B/Hip-Hop Airplay. The song peaked at number 15 on the UK Singles Chart and reached numbers five and four on the UK Dance Chart and the UK R&B Chart, respectively.
 It also peaked at number 11 in New Zealand.

"4 Page Letter" was released as the fourth single on March 18, 1997. Like its predecessor, the song was released as an airplay-only single in the US, therefore was able to enter only airplay charts. It peaked at number 59 on the Radio Songs and at number 12 on the R&B/Hip-Hop Airplay charts. Internationally, it peaked at number 24 on the UK Singles Chart and numbers 14 and nine on the UK Dance Chart and the UK R&B Chart, respectively. 

"The One I Gave My Heart To" was released as the fifth single on August 25. It debuted at number 24 on the Billboard Hot 100 and went on to peak at number nine, becoming the highest-peaking single from One in a Million. On the US Hot R&B/Hip-Hop Songs, it debuted at number 18 and peaked at number seven.  The single was certified gold by the Recording Industry Association of America (RIAA) on October 21, and sold 900,000 copies in the US by the end of 1997. Internationally, the song peaked at number 28 in New Zealand.

"Hot Like Fire" was released as the sixth and final single on September 16, as a double A-side single with "The One I Gave My Heart To". "Hot Like Fire" was ineligible to enter both Billboard Hot 100 and Hot R&B/Hip-Hop Songs, peaking at number 31 on the R&B/Hip-Hop Airplay chart. The double single peaked at number 30 on the UK Singles Chart, as well as at numbers 25 and three on the UK Dance Chart and the UK R&B Chart, respectively.

Critical reception

One in a Million received generally favorable reviews from music critics. In her review for Vibe, Dream Hampton said that Aaliyah's "deliciously feline" voice had the same "pop appeal" as Janet Jackson's and is complemented by the producers' funky, coherent tracks. Connie Johnson of the Los Angeles Times found the album's material exceptional, including the "teasingly witchy" "If Your Girl Only Knew". The Source felt that One in a Million "resides on a different plane than the legion of sophomore attempts that produce only one or two gold singles, Aaliyah is ready to showcase her mature side, her best songs are about relationship woes". Q stated: "With her smooth, sweetly seductive vocal firmly to the fore, [Aaliyah] works through a set of predominantly slow and steamy swingbeat numbers, all clipped beats, luxurious melodies and dreamy harmonies". Robert Christgau, writing in The Village Voice, was less enthusiastic and cited only "Got to Give It Up" as a "choice cut", calling it "a good song on an album that isn't worth your time or money".

Sputnikmusic's Nick Butler deemed it a "strange" record with an overemphasis on "unusually good" and "occasionally brilliant" ballads but plagued by upbeat tracks that were not on-par, except for "Hot Like Fire". People felt that the album offered more variety in content as opposed to Aaliyah's debut studio album Age Ain't Nothing but a Number (1994), saying: "At least she's keeping good company. While R. Kelly produced Aaliyah's debut with a one-dimensional musical vision, One in a Millions production posse (which includes Jermaine Dupri and Timbaland) dips into a languid and seductive trip hop on the title track; then stutters jungle rhythm on 'Beats 4 da Streets' and 'Heartbroken.'" Bob Waliszewski from Plugged In gave the album a mixed review as he felt that Aaliyah had positive things to say on the album but the message got lost in certain songs, stating: "Sexually suggestive lyrics spoil whatever good this disc has going for it". Writing for AllMusic, Leo Stanley viewed the album as a significant improvement over Age Ain't Nothing but a Number, noting a larger variety of material and producers, and described Aaliyah's voice as "smoother, more seductive, and stronger than before". MTV.com praised her vocals on the album and felt that she "glides easily between vocal ranges" and "Her soft style is more refined than the over-exaggerated riffs of other R&B; songstresses".

Accolades

Commercial performance
One in a Million debuted at number 20 on the US Billboard 200 chart dated September 14, 1996, selling 40,500 copies during its first week. The album achieved its highest single-week sales during the Christmas week of 1996, when it sold 71,000 copies. It reached its peak of number 18 on February 1, 1997, and has spent a total of 68 weeks on the Billboard 200. On the US Top R&B/Hip-Hop Albums chart, the album debuted at number 4. In its 22nd week on the chart it peaked at number two on February 8, 1997, spending a total of 72 weeks on the chart. One in a Million was certified gold by the Recording Industry Association of America (RIAA) on October 23, 1996, platinum on February 5, 1997, and double platinum on June 16, 1997. By the end of 1997, the album had sold an additional 1.1 million copies in the United States according to Billboard. By July 2001, it had sold over three million copies according to Nielsen SoundScan. By February 2003, the album had sold an additional 756,000 units through BMG Music Club.

In Canada, One in a Million debuted at number 35 on [[RPM (magazine)|RPM s Top Albums/CDs]] chart on September 9, 1996, reaching its peak of number 33 the following week. In total the album has spent 9 consecutive weeks on the Top Albums/CDs chart. On May 28, 1997, it was certified gold by Music Canada for shipments of 50,000 copies in the country. In the United Kingdom, the album debuted and peaked at numbers 33 and three on the UK Albums Chart and the UK R&B Chart, respectively, on September 7, 1996. It was eventually certified gold by the British Phonographic Industry (BPI) for 100,000 copies shipped in the UK. In Japan, the album peaked at number 36 on the Oricon Albums Chart and received a gold certification from the Recording Industry Association of Japan (RIAJ). As of August 2011, the album has sold over eight million copies worldwide.

After Aaliyah's August 25, 2001, death, One in a Million returned to the Billboard 200 and Top R&B/Hip-Hop Albums, as well as topping the US Top Catalog Albums chart for four weeks. It also re-entered the UK Albums Chart on two separate occasions–at number 106 on February 2, 2002, and at number 169 on April 26, 2003. Following its 2021 reissue, the album reached the top ten on the Billboard 200 for the first time ever, peaking at number ten with 26,000 album-equivalent units, including pure album sales of 13,000 units, streaming-equivalent albums (SEA) of 11,000 units (equaling 14.29 million on-demand streams of the album's tracks), and track-equivalent albums (TEA) of 2,000 units. Additionally, the album re-entered the UK R&B Chart at number eight. On September 4, 2021, its singles "If Your Girl Only Knew", "One in a Million" and "4 Page Letter" debuted at numbers 15, seven and 26 on the US Digital Song Sales, respectively.

Impact and legacy
In a retrospective review of One in a Million, Sal Cinquemani from Slant Magazine said it was "undoubtedly one of the most influential R&B albums of the '90s", and credited it for establishing "Aaliyah and the Timbo family as undeniable hip-hop forces." According to Jon Caramanica from Spin, the album "found Aaliyah at the nexus of street savvy R&B and elegant pop." According to Aisha Harris from NPR, "One In A Million took Aaliyah's air of mystery and the laid-back vibes, and reworked them to help pioneer a new way forward in pop and R&B". In an article commemorating the 20th anniversary of the album's release and the 15th anniversary of Aaliyah's death, Dean Van Nguyen from The Independent stated: "Its handprints can be seen all over the two decades of pop music that followed." One in a Million was credited with elevating Missy Elliott and Timbaland's respective careers in a The Guardian article published upon the album's 2021 reissue; in the same article, Kathy Iandoli–the author of Aaliyah's biography Baby Girl: Better Known as Aaliyah (2021)–stated: "That sound is still the blueprint for all of R&B and pop music today."

One in a Million was ranked at number 90 on Rolling Stones "100 Best Albums of the '90s". It was also listed as one of 33 urban albums on the magazine's list "The Essential Recordings of the '90s". In 2007, Vibe included the album on "The 150 Albums That Define the Vibe Era", stating: "As seductive as an R&B vocalist, Aaliyah is insouciantly sexy on her second album the songwriting isn't quite polished yet, but the early signs are like gleaming flares." In November 2017, the album was ranked seventh on Complexs list "The 50 Best R&B Albums of the '90's"; editor Ross Scarano stated One in a Million "is the definitive account of Aaliyah and Timbaland's collective brilliance" and that the album's singles "If Your Girl Only Knew", "One in a Million", "4 Page Letter" and "Hot Like Fire" "are the songs that modern R&B, rap, and EDM could not do without". In 2020, the album was ranked at number 314 on Rolling Stones list "The 500 Greatest Albums of All Time".

Track listingNotes  signifies an additional producerSample credits'''
"A Girl Like You" contains a sample from "Summer Madness" by Kool & the Gang.
"Heartbroken" contains a sample from "Inside My Love" by Minnie Riperton.
"I Gotcha' Back" contains an interpolation from the song "Lean on Me" by Bill Withers.
"Never Givin' Up" contains an interpolation from the song "I've Got an Angel" by The Clark Sisters.

Personnel
Credits are adapted from the liner notes of One in a Million''.

 Aaliyah – lead vocals
Marc Baptiste – photography
Carlton Batts – mastering
Monica Bell – writing
Thomas Bricker – art direction
Ricky Brown – mixing
Carl-So-Lowe – production, writing
Al Carter – project coordination
Paulinho da Costa – percussion
David de la Cruz – styling
J. Dibbs – mixing, production, vocal arrangement, writing
Pat Dillett – engineering
KayGee – mixing, production, writing
Jimmy Douglass – engineering, mixing
Jermaine Dupri – mixing, production, writing
Missy Elliott – vocals, vocal arrangement, writing
Ronnie Garrett – bass
Ben Garrison – engineering, mixing
Marvin Gaye – writing
Mark Goodman – remixing
Franklin Grant – mixing
Barry Hankerson – creative consultation, executive production
Dianne Hankerson – hair styling
Jomo Hankerson – executive production
Shanga Hankerson – project coordination
Melanie Harris – make-up
Xavier Harris – backing vocals
Demetrius Hart – backing vocals
Michael Haughton – executive production
Pierre Heath – backing vocals
Vincent Herbert – mixing, production
Ernie Isley – writing
Marvin Isley – writing
O'Kelly Isley Jr. – writing
Ronald Isley – writing
Rudolph Isley – writing
Chris Jasper – writing
Rodney Jerkins – instrumentation, mixing, production, vocals, writing
Craig Kallman – executive production
Thom "TK" Kidd – engineering, mixing
Carol Kim – project coordination
Craig King – backing vocals, engineering, production, vocal arrangement, writing
Darren Lighty – mixing, production, writing
Chuck Nice – engineering
Monica Payne – writing
Tavarius Polk – vocals
Michael J. Powell – guitar
Mike Rew – engineering
Daryl Simmons – acoustic guitar, drum programming, drums, keyboards, production
Ivy Skoff – production coordination
Slick Rick – vocals
Rashad Smith – production, remixing
Sound Boy – engineering
Sebrina Swaby – project coordination
Phil Tan – engineering, mixing, backing vocals
Tann – backing vocals
Japhe Tejeda – writing
Timbaland – mixing, production, vocals, writing
Diane Warren – writing
Freddie "Ready" Washington – bass

Charts

Weekly charts

Year-end charts

Certifications and sales

|-

Release history

See also
 Album era
 Alternative R&B
 Rolling Stones 500 Greatest Albums of All Time

Notes

References

Bibliography

External links
 Aaliyah's discography on official website
 

1996 albums
Aaliyah albums
Albums produced by Rodney Jerkins
Albums produced by Jermaine Dupri
Albums produced by Timbaland
Atlantic Records albums
Hip hop soul albums